Joy is the second studio album released by Canadian singer-songwriter Fefe Dobson, and third studio album to be recorded. It was released on November 22, 2010 on Island Records in Canada and November 30, 2010 on 21 Music in the United States after taking almost four years to complete. It candidly follows Dobson's evolution as an artist as well as transition from the indie type of music she originally put together for Joy, to the mainstream pop hits. The album was preceded by the release of the two buzz singles "Watch Me Move" and "I Want You", which were then followed-up by the three top 20 official singles "Ghost", "Stuttering" and "Can't Breathe", all of which have at least one music video.

Background and development 

By 2006, Dobson returned to the studio to work on what was to become her unreleased album at the time, Sunday Love, which featured collaborations with such artists as Billy Steinberg, Matthew Wilder, Cyndi Lauper, Courtney Love, Joan Jett, Nina Gordon, The Neptunes and Rancid’s Tim Armstrong. In the interim, several of her songs were covered, including "Start All Over", a song which was recorded for Sunday Love, but never made the album, by Miley Cyrus, "Don't Let It Go to Your Head", the first single, by American Idol winner Jordin Sparks, and "As a Blonde", which was covered by Selena Gomez & the Scene. Dobson was dropped from her label, Island Records, upon the shelving of her album, Sunday Love, after the release of two singles from it, the album was later released digitally in 2012. She then decided to go back to her roots and create a new album on her own terms. She said in an April 2007 interview that her new efforts were coming along nicely and should see the light of day sooner than later. However, during Dobson's songwriting and independent period, Joy had faced multiple delays due to her management, Chris Smith Management. Two years after Dobson spoke with ChartAttack.com, she was picked back up by Island. This caused numerous more push backs since Island wanted Dobson to write new tracks for the album, and omit previous ones.

In an interview to Idolator, Fefe said: "Now, I write a lot more on guitar. I know that sounds weird, but I do. I find that I write on this record from guitar starting off. Also, I’m not this, like, tough on myself. When I was younger I used to write and go, 'Oh, that’s not good enough.' 'No. No. No. No one will like that.' 'I can't write that by myself because no one will understand.' And now, I put myself out there a little more. I take the risk of when I’m writing with somebody I’m not as afraid to say, 'Hey, what about this idea?' When I was young I was a little bit more afraid to step out and to make a mistake." The album reflects the "emotional" and "dramatic" music of her adolescence, with Dobson using Janet Jackson's "Black Cat" as a specific example.

Composition and production 

From the rhyme playground anthem and first single, "I Want You", the tribal percussion of "Can't Breathe", produced by rock legend Bob Ezrin (KISS, Pink Floyd's The Wall, Lou Reed), and the sassy retort of "You Bitch", produced by Howard Benson (All-American Rejects, My Chemical Romance, Daughtry, Hawthorne Heights, Gavin DeGraw, Papa Roach), to the dance-floor thump of the tongue-in-chic "Paranoia" and the arena, flick-your-Bic torch song, "In Your Touch", Fefe has finally found the sweet spot in her mix of rock and club beats. Joy reflects that passion, both musical and personal, with Fefe's sensuality oozing out of songs like the speeded-up punk of "Watch Me Move" ("I’m a firecracker/Better tell your mother… W-w-w-w-watch me move"), the Pretenders-like ballad "Shame" and the pure ecstasy of the title track ("I got joy in the bedroom/When it’s just you and I/I got joy when you satisfy me").

Working with producers David Lichens, Jon Levine, Howard Benson and Bob Ezrin on Joy, Dobson lives up to the portraits of her heroes she first hung during the recording of her first album—Kurt Cobain, Judy Garland, Coldplay, the Vines and Jeff Buckley. She co-wrote most of the songs on the album, usually composing on guitar, her choice of instrument.
"I play the few chords that I know," she says. "I try to write melodies off the same chords. ‘Joy’ is written with about three chords, and an extra one in the bridge."
Songs like "I Want You", which has been heard in the TV series The Vampire Diaries, as well as in promos for the film Whip It and The Sims 3: World Adventures computer game, come straight from experience.

“Shame” is a torch song underlined with jungle rhythms that is a confessional in which she does the breaking up. “When I went to demo the song, I had to go see an ex-boyfriend,” says Fefe. “I felt I betrayed him, so I wanted to clear the air. I could not sing it until I did. This reflects that relationship. As humans, we're not perfect. We sometimes hurt people and break hearts, but it’s OK to apologize.”
In "Can’t Breathe" and "Watch Me Move", Fefe is confident in showing off her raw sexuality. About the album she said: "I don't regret a thing," she says. "I keep moving forward and not looking back. I couldn't ask for anything better. I’m a girl from suburban Canada who never thought I’d be able to do what I’ve accomplished. And I’m not done yet."

Promotion 

Two buzz singles for the record were released in 2008 and 2009. The first, "Watch Me Move", was released as a digital music download on September 9, 2008. The second, "I Want You", was released digitally on July 3, 2009. These songs have been featured in film, television, and more. Dobson also re-recorded the vocals for "I Want You" in Simlish for the PC game The Sims 3: World Adventures.  On August 5, 2009, a group of music videos premiered on MTV, The N, and LOGO. They consisted of the individual videos for "I Want You" and "Watch Me Move", a mashup of "I Want You" and "Watch Me Move" entitled "I Want You 2 Watch Me Move", and a remix of "I Want You".

On August 11, 2009, Dobson performed a concert at the Mercury Lounge in New York City. Attendance was by invitation only and included fans and music industry tastemakers. "Fefe performed a set — which included old favorites from her self-titled debut album and upcoming sophomore effort, Joy — that was drenched with passion, soaked with edge, and slicked with pop perfection." "Her new songs were incredibly well received and displayed the incredible growth and maturity of Fefe’s music." One of the new songs heard was "I Made Out with Your Boyfriend" and a video was captured by a correspondent. In an interview at the showcase, Dobson mused "It's almost like when an animal is in a small cage, but when you let it out it's running around like crazy. That's how I feel when I'm onstage." For the remainder of the year, Dobson performed at various events while she was finishing up the album.

On August 27, 2009 Dobson gave a "sneak peek" of her song "Paranoia" also stating that it will be a single, but was later not featured on the album. It was featured in the promo for the Fox series, Fringe.

Dobson performed on a twenty city tour across Canada in March and April 2010 on Hedley's The Show Must Go...On The Road Tour.

Critical reception 

The album received critical acclaim from both Seventeen and the website Allmusic, who gave it a rating of 4.5/5 stars. Matthew Chisling said: "Joy may not be such a cheerful album, but it stands to be an epic comeback for a genuinely talented pop artist who was shafted by the industry that would welcome her back with open arms, and that is definitely a joyous story". On the other hand, NOW gave Joy a poor review, saying "There’s a handful of good guitar-fuelled anthems, but they're grossly outnumbered by bland mid-tempo pop tunes that go nowhere. Maybe a mixed-race rocker chick from Scarborough is a tough thing for a major label to know how to market, but trying to turn her into a third-rate Rihanna is not the answer".

Commercial performance 

The album debuted and peaked at number 10 on the Canadian Top 100 Albums Chart. Since its release in November 2010 the album has sold 60,000 copies in Canada, 271,000 in the U.S. and nearly 350,000 copies worldwide

Singles 

"Ghost" was released on June 21, 2010, as the album's lead single, following the release of two promotional singles. The single officially impacted mainstream radio on May 11, 2010. The song peaked at number 14 on the Canadian Hot 100. "Stuttering" was released as the second single on September 7, 2010. The single officially impacted mainstream radio on October 12, 2010. The song reached number 10 on the Canadian Hot 100 and number 40 on the US Pop Songs, becoming the most successful single of the album. A video was shot for "Can't Breathe" and was released on March 30, 2011 on MuchMusic. The song debuted at number 100 on the Canadian Hot 100 chart and has peaked at number 19 in its eleventh week. Dobson has reported on her Twitter that the song has been sent to radio.

Track listing 

(*) Additional production

Personnel 

Credits for Joy adapted from Allmusic

 Josh Abraham – composer, producer
 Jorn Anderson – drums
 Joe Baldridge – mixing
 Howard Benson – keyboards, producer, programming
 Cameron Bristow – assistant engineer, digital editing, Pro-Tools
 Kim Bullard – keyboards, programming
 Paul Bushnell – bass
 Noel "Gadget" Campbell – A&R, executive producer
 Ryan Chalmers – assistant engineer, digital editing, Pro-Tools
 Ben Chang – engineer
 Justin Cortelyou – engineer
 Dorian Crozier – drums
 Adam Culvey – drums, percussion
 Jeff Dalziel – vocal producer, vocal recording
 Paul DeCarli – digital editing
 Dean Dichoso – drums, engineer, mixing
 Kara DioGuardi – composer, vocal arrangement
 Fefe Dobson – composer, executive producer, vocals (background)
 Bob Erzin – composer, keyboards, producer, programming
 Stephen Ferrera – A&R
 Chris Gehringer – mastering
 Serban Ghenea – mixing
 Keith Haaland – guitar
 Kevin Haaland – guitar
 Alex Haldi – art direction, graphic design, photography
 Ray Hammond – A&R
 Vicki Hampton – vocals (background)

 John Hanes – mixing
 Tommy Henriksen – associate producer, composer, electric guitar, programming
 Steve Hunter – guitar
 Hatsukazu "Hatch" Inagaki – engineer
 Rami Jaffee – keyboards
 Terese Joseph – A&R
 Doug Joswick – package production
 Nikki Jumper – cover photo
 Dan Katner – guitar
 Claude Kelly – composer, vocal producer, vocals (background)
 Emanuel Kiriakou – guitar
 Tim Lauer – keyboarding, programming
 Jon Levine – composer, keyboards, producer
 Dave Lichens – bass, composer, producer, programming
 Brian Malouf – mixing
 John Nicholson – drum technician
 Oligee – producer
 Orianthi – guitar, soloist
 Eric Pall – drums
 Timm Parker – assistant engineer, digital editing, Pro-Tools
 Jeff Pelletier – assistant engineer, digital editing, Pro-Tools
 Mike Plotnikoff – engineer
 Eric Ratz – engineer, mixing
 Antonio "L.A." Reid – executive producer
 Tim Roberts – mixing assistant
 Marc Rogers – bass
 J.R. Rotem – composer, instrumentation, producer
 Kevin Rudolf – composer, instrumentation, producer
 Thomas "Tawgs" Salter – composer, keyboards, programming
 Rony Schram – photography
 George Seara – engineer
 Chris Smith – executive producer
 Mike Smith – assistant engineer, digital editing, Pro-Tools
 James Allan Toth – assistant engineer, digital editing, Pro-Tools
 Marc VanGool – guitar technician
 Luke Walker – additional production, composer
 Ryan Williams – engineer
 Phil X.-guitar
 Kristen Yiengst – art coordinator, photography
 Frank Zummo – drums

Charts

Certifications

Release history

References 

2010 albums
Fefe Dobson albums
Albums produced by Bob Ezrin
Albums produced by Howard Benson
Albums produced by David Lichens
Albums produced by J. R. Rotem
Albums produced by Josh Abraham
Island Records albums
Albums produced by Jon Levine